The legislative districts of Davao del Sur are the representations of the province of Davao del Sur in the various national legislatures of the Philippines. The province is currently represented in the lower house of the Congress of the Philippines through its lone congressional district.

Davao City and Davao Occidental last formed part of the province's representation in 1972 and 2016, respectively.

History 

Prior to gaining separate representation, areas now under the jurisdiction of Davao del Sur were represented under the Department of Mindanao and Sulu (1917–1935) and the historical Davao Province (1935–1967).

The enactment of Republic Act No. 4867 on May 8, 1967 split the old Davao Province into Davao del Norte, Davao del Sur and Davao Oriental. Per Section 4 of R.A. 4867, the incumbent Davao Province representative was to indicate which of the three new provinces he wished to continue to represent; Rep. Lorenzo Sarmiento chose Davao del Norte, which left the seats for Davao del Sur (together grouped with the chartered city of Davao) and Davao Oriental open for the special elections scheduled for November 14, 1967. Davao del Sur, along with Davao City, were represented together from the second half of the 6th Congress until the end of the 7th Congress.

Davao del Sur was represented in the Interim Batasang Pambansa as part of Region XI from 1978 to 1984, and returned two representatives, elected at-large, to the Regular Batasang Pambansa in 1984. Davao City separately elected its own representatives starting that year.

Under the new Constitution which was proclaimed on February 11, 1987, Davao del Sur was reapportioned into two congressional districts; each elected its member to the restored House of Representatives starting that same year.

The passage of Republic Act No. 10360 and its subsequent ratification by plebiscite in 2013 separated five southern municipalities of Davao del Sur to create the province of Davao Occidental. Per Section 7 of R.A. 10360, Davao del Sur's own representation was reduced to a single congressional district. The newly reconfigured lone district elected its representative in the 2016 elections.

Lone District 
Population (2015):  632,588

1968–1972 
 includes the present-day city and province of Davao and Davao Occidental

Notes

1st District (defunct) 
City: Digos (became city 2000)
Municipalities: Bansalan, Hagonoy, Magsaysay, Matanao, Padada, Santa Cruz

2nd District (defunct) 

Municipalities: Don Marcelino, Jose Abad Santos, Kiblawan, Malalag, Malita, Santa Maria, Sarangani, Sulop

At-Large (defunct) 
 includes the present-day province of Davao Occidental

See also 
Legislative district of Mindanao and Sulu
Legislative district of Davao
Legislative districts of Davao City
Legislative district of Davao Occidental

References 

Davao del Sur
Politics of Davao del Sur